The Desaer ATL-100 (ATL being Portuguese for "light transport aircraft") is a twin-turboprop, high-wing, utility aircraft under development by Desaer in Brazil and by CEiiA in Portugal.

Development

By 25 September 2020, a joint-venture between Brazilian Desaer and Portuguese engineering centre CEIIA was expected to create 1,200 jobs at a new integrated factory in Evora.
The ATL-100 should then be developed over three years.

Design

The ATL-100 is a non-pressurized, twin-turboprop, high-wing utility aircraft with a fixed tricycle landing gear and an aft cargo ramp.
It could operate on unpaved and short runaways, with low or absent ground support; and targets robustness and easy maintenance, and low operations costs. Quick-change variants could be offered for air ambulance, emergency evacuation, paratrooper or troop transport; and for patrol, surveillance, intelligence, reconnaissance.

ATL-100H 
The ATL-100H is a variant of the original that adds two outboard magniX magni350 electric motors to the configuration. Their role is to provide additional thrust, primarily for take-off and climbing. Each 111.5-kg (246-lb) motor offers 350-kW/1,610 Nm (1,188 ft lb) of maximum continuous torque. The company claimed that it would reduce fuel consumption by 25-40% and lower take-off noise levels.

Specifications

See also

References

External links
 

Proposed aircraft
Proposed aircraft of Brazil
T-tail aircraft
High-wing aircraft
Twin-turboprop tractor aircraft